Hush is a 2013 Croatian drama film directed by Lukas Nola.

Cast 
 Tihana Lazović - Beba
 Milan Pleština - Tata
 Živko Anočić - Mirko
 Lana Barić - Mama
 Ksenija Pajić - Jelena
 Bojan Navojec - Simic

References

External links 

2013 drama films
2013 films
Croatian drama films
2010s Croatian-language films